The SS Wafra oil spill occurred on 27 February 1971, when SS Wafra, an oil tanker, ran aground while under tow near Cape Agulhas, South Africa. Approximately 200,000 barrels of crude oil were leaked into the ocean. The larger part of the ship was refloated, towed out to sea, and then sunk by the South African Air Force to prevent further oil contamination of the coastline.

Grounding and sinking

Half the cargo was owned by Chevron Oil Sales Co., and the other half by Texaco Export, Inc.

The ship was rounding the southern tip of Africa at 6:30 am on 27 February 1971 when the piping that brought seawater on board to cool her steam turbine failed. The engine room flooded, incapacitating the ship. The tow cable subsequently broke, and Wafra grounded on a reef near Cape Agulhas at 5:30 pm on 28 February. All six of the port cargo tanks, as well as two of the six center tanks, were ruptured, resulting in approximately 26,000 tonnes of oil leaking at the grounding site, of which 6,000 tonnes washed up at Cape Agulhas. Another source estimated that nearly 14 million gallons of oil was lost in the event (approx 45500 tonnes).

A  by  oil spill resulted, which affected a colony of 1200 African penguins on Dyer Island near Gansbaai. Beaches from Gansbaai to Cape Agulhas were oiled by the slick. Almost  of detergent was sprayed onto the slick in efforts to prevent it washing ashore or harming marine life.

The ship was refloated and pulled off the reef on 8 March by the German tug Oceanic, but started to break apart. To prevent further oil contamination of the coastline, the larger section was towed  out to sea to the edge of the continental shelf, leaving a  oil slick in her wake. On 10 March 1971, Buccaneer aircraft of the South African Air Force attempted to sink her with AS-30L missiles, but succeeded only in starting a fire.

If Wafra had been a twin screw, two engine room ship, loss of an engine would most likely not have caused the loss of the whole ship. At the time, the oil spill was in the top twenty most disastrous tanker spills on record.

Aftermath
In the wake of the accident, the South African Department of Transport realised that despite many Very Large Crude Carriers (VLCCs) using the Cape sea route each year, the authorities did not have ocean-going tugs that were able to assist them in distress, and to protect sensitive marine areas by breaking up oil spills with chemical dispersants. They therefore set up an oil spill prevention service known as Kuswag (Coastwatch) and commissioned two new salvage tugs, John Ross and Wolraad Woltemade. The two tugs, with their  engines, held the record as the world's largest salvage tugs.

The incident is featured in the 1975 book Supership by Noel Mostert.

See also
Oswego-Guardian/Texanita collision
Venpet-Venoil collision
Torrey Canyon oil spill

References

Further reading

External links
Photos of beach contamination
Photos of ship on fire

Shipwrecks of the South African Indian Ocean coast
Maritime incidents in 1971
Maritime incidents in South Africa
1971 in South Africa
Oil spills in South Africa
Environment of South Africa
1971 in the environment
Merchant ships sunk by aircraft
Ships sunk as targets
1955 ships
Wafra
Ships sunk by South African aircraft
1971 disasters in South Africa
1971 disasters in Africa